The 1914 Giro d'Italia was the sixth Giro; it was organised and sponsored by the newspaper La Gazzetta dello Sport. The race was won by the Italian rider Alfonso Calzolari of the Stucchi team. Second and third respectively were the Italian riders Pierino Albini and Luigi Lucotti.

It was the last Giro before the Great War and the first one with a final classification based on time rather than points.

It is remembered as the hardest Giro of the heroic period of bicycle racing. Besides five stages of over 400 km (and the longest ever average stage length), it included the longest stage ever in the history of the Giro: the Lucca-Rome stage won by Costante Girardengo. This edition of the Giro was run at the lowest average speed (23.374 km/h); marked the highest gap between the first and the second (1 hour, 55 minutes and 26 seconds); saw the longest ever stage by time taken (the Bari-L'Aquila). Only 8 riders (of 81 participants) finished the race.

The sixth stage (Bari-L'Aquila) is remembered as the hardest stage in the history of the Giro, with many riders forced to retire, including the first of the general classification Giuseppe Azzini, who was found the next day resting in a country house.

The Giro organisation declared Calzolari winner after the race, but a legal battle started between the Giro organisation and the Italian Cycling Union, who thought Calzolari should have been removed from the race for taking help from a car, making Albini the winner. After 14 months in court, the final decision was in favor of the Giro organisation, thus making Calzolari the definitive winner.

Participants

Before the race started, 98 cyclists had entered themselves in the race, of which 35 were professional cyclists in a team, 41 were professional cyclists without a team, and 22 were amateurs. Favorites for the race were Lucien Petit-Breton from France, and Ganna, Galetti, Girardengo, Giuseppe Santhià and Azzini from Italy. Race director Cougnet decided to allow amateurs due to the low number of cyclists and teams that had registered in the weeks prior to the start. Many of these riders were unemployed and borrowed bikes in order to participate. Umberto Ripamonti was the youngest to enter the race at age nineteen.

At 24 May, when the Giro began, 81 of them started the race; only eight of them made it to the finish in Milan on 7 June. Riders were allowed to ride on their own or as a member of a team. There were eight teams that competed in the race: Alcyon, Atala, Bianchi, Ganna, Gerbi, Globo, Maino, and Stucchi. The field featured three former Giro d'Italia champions in the 1909 winner Luigi Ganna, three-time winner Carlo Galetti, Eberardo Pavesi who was a member of the 1912 Atala winning team, and returning champion Carlo Oriani. Other notable Italian riders that started the race included Costante Girardengo, Angelo Gremo, Alfonso Calzolari, and Giovanni Gerbi.

Race summary

The race itself began at midnight. Angelo Gremo won the stage ahead of Carlo Durando and Alfonso Calzolari who finished over thirteen minutes in arrears. After those three finishers, 34 more crossed the line with the last rider finishing 7 hours after Calzolari. Only three aspiranti riders remained.

Final standings

The race compared to the previous year's edition featured fewer stages and a longer total distance. The route covered the whole stretch of the country from northwest to southeast in Bari. Race director Armando Cougnet decided to abandon the points system for calculating the general classification in favor of a purely time based approached where the leader was the rider with the lowest total time raced for all stages – a decision the Tour de France director Henri Desgrange did in 1913. The prize for winning the race in 1914 was 3,000 lire.

Stage results

General classification

There were eight cyclists who had completed all eight stages. For these cyclists, the times they had needed in each stage was added up for the general classification. The cyclist with the least accumulated time was the winner. Enrico Sala won the prize for best ranked isolati rider in the general classification.

Of the two cyclists without a team, Sala rode as a professional  and Ripamonti as an amateur .

Aftermath
During the race, Calzolari, Canepari and Durando had been given a penalty of 3 hours, for taking help from a car. After the race, the Italian Cycling Union said that the Giro jury had made a wrong decision, and that the three cyclists should have been removed from the race, declaring Albini the winner. The Giro organisation did not agree, and declared that Calzolari stayed the winner. The two parties went to court, and in February the Giro organisation won, and again after an appeal in July 1915, making Calzolari the definitive winner.

The race has since been regarded as the hardest Grand Tour of all-time. Due to the race's reputation, British author Tim Moore rode the route in autumn of 2012. Moore elected to ride the course in period attire and on a period bicycle. He then published a book where he detailed his exploits entitled Gironimo!: Riding the Very Terrible 1914 Tour of Italy.

References

Footnotes

Citations

Bibliography

 
Giro d'Italia by year
Giro Ditalia, 1914
Giro Ditalia, 1914
Giro d'Italia
Giro d'Italia